Flesh & Blood is the third studio album by American glam metal band Poison, released on July 2, 1990, through the Enigma label of Capitol Records. It peaked at number 2 on the Billboard charts
and more than 7.2 million copies were sold worldwide. It peaked at number 1 on the Cash Box charts.

The album was an attempt by the band to establish a more serious musical stance, more than just the hair metal party dynamic of 1988's Open Up and Say... Ahh!. It spawned two top 10 singles, "Unskinny Bop" and "Something to Believe In" and three other hit singles, "Ride the Wind", "Life Goes On", and "(Flesh & Blood) Sacrifice".

It was certified Platinum in 1990 and triple Platinum in 1991 by the RIAA. It has been certified 4× Platinum by CAN and Gold by BPI.

Production and marketing
The album was recorded and mixed at Little Mountain Sound Studios, Vancouver, British Columbia, Canada, with Canadian producer Bruce Fairbairn and mixer Mike Fraser.

The front cover art features the Poison logo and album title as a tattoo on drummer Rikki Rockett's arm. The cover was originally planned to have a slightly different version of the tattoo after being freshly inked, with inflamed red skin with dripping ink or blood. The original cover was released for the initial pressing in Japan but was removed from all later pressings including those in Japan. The record's marketing reflected the end of Poison's glam image, including excessive make-up and teased, girlish hair as with Look What the Cat Dragged In, instead being similar to Guns N' Roses.

Songs
Parts of the album are darker and more serious, including overcoming hard times, missing loved ones, long-term relationships, and mass sociopolitical disillusionment. Fun topics include sex, exhilaration from music or motorbikes, and tongue-in-cheek poverty. Some songs have a blues rock style.

The meaning of the album's lead single "Unskinny Bop", one of the band's most popular songs, is obscure. DeVille later confessed that the phrase "unskinny bop" has no particular meaning. He devised it as a temporary measure while writing the song, before vocalist Bret Michaels had begun working on the lyrics. The phrase was used on the basis that it was phonetically suited to the music. The song was later played to producer Fairbairn, who stated that although he did not know what an "unskinny bop" was, the phrase was perfect.

Accolades
Flesh & Blood was voted Best Album in Circus magazine's 1990 Readers' Poll, and the album's second single "Something to Believe In" was voted Best Single.

The album yielded three Metal Edge Readers' Choice Awards in 1990: Album of the Year, and "Something to Believe In" for Song of the Year and Best Video.

Track listing

† The 2006 reissue contains a mastering error, as the last few seconds of "Poor Boy Blues" are missing from this version.

Video album
Flesh, Blood, & Videotape is the second video compilation released by Poison, featuring the music videos from Flesh & Blood.

 "Let It Play" (Montage clip)
 "Unskinny Bop"
 "Ride the Wind"
 "Poor Boy Blues" (Montage clip)
 "Something to Believe In"
 "Life Goes On"
 "(Flesh & Blood) Sacrifice" (Uncensored version)

Personnel
 Bret Michaels - lead vocals, rhythm guitar
 C.C. DeVille - lead guitar, backing vocals
 Bobby Dall - bass, piano, backing vocals
 Rikki Rockett - drums, backing vocals
 John Webster - keyboards, piano

Production
Produced by Bruce Fairbairn
Co-produced by Mike Fraser
Mastered by George Marino at Sterling Sound, NYC

Charts

Certifications

References

1990 albums
Poison (American band) albums
Capitol Records albums
Enigma Records albums
Albums produced by Bruce Fairbairn
Albums recorded at Little Mountain Sound Studios
Blues rock albums by American artists